Busan Citizens Park (formerly Camp Hialeah) is a former Imperial Japanese Army base and United States Army camp located in the Busanjin District of the city of Busan, South Korea. The Camp occupying  of prime real estate was closed on 10 August 2006 and handed back to the Busan city government. It was redeveloped as the Busan Citizens Park and opened on 1 May 2014.

History

Racetrack 

During the Japanese occupation of Korea, a horse racing track encircling the main area of the Camp was owned by the Chōsen Racing Association. A visiting American sailor is purported to have named the camp after the Hialeah Park Race Track in Hialeah, Florida.

Imperial Japanese Army occupation 

The area served as the Imperial Japanese Army headquarters in Busan until the surrender of Japan.

United States Army occupation 

U.S. troops took command of Camp Hialeah on 17 September 1945 and remained until the end of 1948 when control of the installation passed to the U.S. Consulate and the United Nations.

Busan was a critical strategic and logistical staging area during the Korean War. By 5 September 1950, the Korean People's Army held most of the Korean peninsula, except for the U.N. forces beachhead around the Pusan Perimeter. Busan port facilities were under the control of the U.S. military to handle the enormous support requirements of the fighting forces, with the 8069th Replacement Depot operating Camp Hialeah. After the Korean Armistice Agreement was signed on 27 July 1953, most of the Busan port facilities were turned over to the ROK government.

Since the Korean War, Camp Hialeah was organised under different commands and missions. They included the 8069th Replacement Depot, the Korean Communications Zone, Busan Military Post, Busan Sub Area Command, Busan Area Command, Busan Base Command, 2nd Transportations Group, Busan Support Activity, U.S. Army Garrison-Busan, 34th, and 20th Support Groups, and 19th Theater Area Command, Area IV, 20th Area Support Group.

Camp Hialeah was a primary receiving point for materiel, equipment, supplies, and goods to U.S. Army bases in the Republic of Korea and was one of the primary Non-combatant Evacuation Operations (NEO) routes for U.S. personnel in and out of the Republic of Korea. Camp Hialeah supported tenant units that included:
142nd Quartermaster Battalion now designated the 142nd Combat Sustainment Support Battalion
Busan Storage Facility, the largest (cold) storage facility within U.S. Forces Korea for supplies and goods to commissaries and exchanges Korea-wide
61st Chemical Company
552nd Military Police Company 
4th Quartermaster Detachment (Airborne). 
Other tenant activities supported by Camp Hialeah included personnel of Air Force units at the Combat Ready Contingency Hospital, 
25th Transportation Battalion 
Communications unit and the AMC Terminal at Gimhae Air Base
837th Transport Battalion 
Transportation Motor Pool
Defense Contract Management Command-Gimhae
Military Sealift Command Operations, US Navy
74th Signal Company 
Defense Reutilization Management Operations
Chejudo Recreation Center
72nd Ordnance Company; C. Company
168th Medical Battalion
106th Medical Detachment
Criminal Investigations Division
Navy Office of Special Investigations
USAF Office of Special Investigations
665th Medical (Dental) Detachment
524th Military Intelligence Battalion
1st Signal Brigade\
154th Medical Detachment. 

At its peak, the Camp and its associated facilities had a population of 2,500 U.S. military and Department of Defense civilian employees.

Return to Busan Government 

Originally, the Camp was distant from residential areas, but as the city of Busan grew it eventually surrounded the Camp. Under the guidelines of the U.S.–South Korea Status of Forces Agreement (SOFA), comparable facilities that comply with U.S. standards and infrastructure are required to ensure quality of life for U.S. soldiers and families prior to installation relocation. On 1 June 2005, pursuant to the Amended Land Partnership Plan between the U.S. and the Republic of Korea, it was announced that Camp Hialeah would close. The last units to leave the installation were the 72nd Ordnance Company and 6th Korean Service Corps Company, which were reassigned on the Korean Peninsula; while the 552nd Military Police Company, 4th Quartermaster Detachment (Airborne) and the 61st Chemical Company relocated to Schofield Barracks, Hawaii, Alaska and Fort Lewis, Washington, respectively. On 10 August 2006 Camp Hialeah was formally returned to Busan Metropolitan City. The US and South Korean governments disagreed over the issue of environmental cleanup of the Camp and this delayed its redevelopment by 4 years until it was agreed that South Korea would meet the cleanup costs. The Camp was open to the public from 24 April to 30 September, 2010 before closing for redevelopment.

Busan Citizens Park 

The site was redeveloped as Busan Citizens Park with 5 themes and 29 separate attractions. The Park opening was delayed due to the discovery of environmental contamination in 3 areas of the site. The Park was opened to the public on 1 May 2014. Several of the Park buildings are refurbished military base buildings including several Quonset huts.

See also 
 List of United States Army installations in South Korea
 Children's Grand Park, Busan

References

External links 
 Busan Citizens Park website (English)

Parks in Busan
United States military in South Korea
2014 establishments in South Korea